Iglinsky District (İglin rayonı) is an administrative and municipal district (raion), one of the fifty-four in the Republic of Bashkortostan, Russia. It is located in the east of the republic and borders with Nurimanovsky District in the north, Chelyabinsk Oblast in the east, Arkhangelsky District in the south, Karmaskalinsky District in the southwest, Ufimsky District in the west, and with Blagoveshchensky District in the northwest. Its administrative center is the rural locality (a selo) of Iglino. As of the 2010 Census, the total population of the district was 49,675, with the population of Iglino accounting for 33.8% of that number.

History
The district was established on January 31, 1935, when it was split from Ufimsky District.

Administrative and municipal status
Within the framework of administrative divisions, Iglinsky District is one of the fifty-four in the Republic of Bashkortostan. The district is divided into 19 selsoviets, comprising 128 rural localities. As a municipal division, the district is incorporated as Iglinsky Municipal District. Its nineteen selsoviets are incorporated as nineteen rural settlements within the municipal district. The selo of Iglino serves as the administrative center of both the administrative and municipal district.

Demographics

In terms of ethnic composition, 38.3% of the population are Russians, 32.0% are Bashkirs, and 12.4% are Tatars.

References

Notes

Sources

Districts of Bashkortostan
States and territories established in 1935
 
